Vladimír Körner (born 12 October 1939 in Prostějov) is a Czech novelist and screenwriter. His novels were also adapted into screenplays for about 20 films.

Partial filmography 
The Valley of the Bees (1968)
Adelheid (film) (1969)
Angel of Mercy (1993)
Spring of Life (2000)

Selected novels 
''Zánik samoty Berhof (1973)

References

External links 

Czech novelists
Male novelists
Czech male writers
1939 births
Living people
Czech screenwriters
Male screenwriters